Grant Ernest John Tambling, AM (born 20 June 1943) is an Australian politician. He was a member of the House of Representatives from 1980 to 1983 and then a Senator for the Northern Territory from 1987 to 2001, representing the Country Liberal Party. In federal parliament, he sat with the National Country Party, later renamed National Party. He later served as Administrator of Norfolk Island from 2003 to 2007.

Early life
Tambling was born and raised in Darwin in the Northern Territory. He attended Darwin High School and Adelaide Boys' High School, returning to Darwin before moving to Sydney for work.

Politics

|}
After a stint in local government on the Darwin City Council, Tambling was elected to the first Northern Territory Legislative Assembly as the Country Liberal Party member for Fannie Bay. Tambling served as Executive Member for Community Development in that first parliament. Executive members were the equivalent of ministers in later years, though that title was not used until self-government was granted in 1978.

In 1975, he became deputy leader of the CLP and hence Deputy Majority Leader (deputy premier) under Majority Leader Goff Letts. Despite that, Tambling was defeated at the 1977 election by Labor Party candidate Pam O'Neil, and began a career in business. He served as the member for the Northern Territory electorate in the House of Representatives from 1980 to 1983, but was again defeated by an ALP rival, John Reeves. He sat with the parliamentary National Country Party like his predecessor Sam Calder.

After four years out of parliament, Tambling was once again elected—this time to the Senate—at the 1987 federal election. He replaced Bernie Kilgariff, who he had earlier replaced as Deputy Majority leader. Unlike Kilgariff who sat with the Liberal Party, Tambling continued to sit with the parliamentary National Party (since renamed from National Country Party), as he did previously as member for Northern Territory. He is the only Territorian to have served in both houses of federal parliament. He was also the deputy National Party leader in the Senate between 10 April 1990 and 23 March 1993, and a second time between 11 May 2000 and 9 November 2001. He also spent almost six years as parliamentary secretary in the Howard government, between 11 March 1996 and 26 November 2001.

Tambling spent fourteen years as a Senator before being disendorsed by the CLP at the 2001 election for voting in favour of anti-Internet gaming legislation. Tambling subsequently retired from politics and worked for two years in private consultancy.

Norfolk Island
Tambling was appointed as the Administrator of Norfolk Island, for a term lasting from 1 November 2003 to September 2007.

Personal life
He is married with two children.

References

 

1943 births
Living people
Country Liberal Party members of the Parliament of Australia
Deputy Chief Ministers of the Northern Territory
Members of the Australian House of Representatives
Members of the Australian House of Representatives for Northern Territory
Members of the Australian Senate
Members of the Australian Senate for the Northern Territory
Members of the Northern Territory Legislative Assembly
Administrators of Norfolk Island
Members of the Order of Australia
Country Liberal Party members of the Northern Territory Legislative Assembly
21st-century Australian politicians
20th-century Australian politicians
People from Darwin, Northern Territory
National Party of Australia members of the Parliament of Australia
Northern Territory politicians
People educated at Adelaide High School